The 1848 United States presidential election in Iowa took place on November 7, 1848, as part of the 1848 United States presidential election. Voters chose four representatives, or electors to the Electoral College, who voted for President and Vice President.

Iowa voted for the Democratic candidate Lewis Cass in the state's first presidential election, over Whig candidate Zachary Taylor and Free Soil candidate Martin Van Buren. Cass won Iowa by a margin of 5.87%.

This is one of just three times (the others being 1988 and 2000) that a losing Democrat carried Iowa.  Taylor became the first of currently only six American presidents to have never won Iowa since its statehood. 

The 1848 election in Iowa began a trend in which the state would vote the same as neighboring Wisconsin, as the two states have voted in lockstep with each other on all but 6 occasions - 1892, 1924, 1940, 1976, 2004, and 2020.

Results

See also
 United States presidential elections in Iowa

References

Iowa
1848
1848 Iowa elections